Ahna Renee Skop is an American geneticist, artist, and a professor at the University of Wisconsin–Madison. She is known for her research on the mechanisms underlying asymmetric cell division, particularly the importance of the midbody in this process.

Education 
Skop grew up in Connecticut and Northern Kentucky. She received a Bachelor of Science in biology from Syracuse University and went on to complete her Ph.D. in cellular and molecular biology at the University of Wisconsin-Madison. She then did postdoctoral work at the University of California, Berkeley. Skop then moved to the University of Wisconsin–Madison where, as of 2022, she is professor.

Career 
Skop is known for her work on Caenorhabditis elegans, a free-living worm, and mammalian tissue culture cells where she has studied the mechanisms that control cell division. Her early work was on the final stages of cell division in C. elegans, and she identified the proteins in the midbody that are involved in cell division. Her more recent work examines defects that could be caused by problems in the midbody, where she has shown that midbody is an organelle that harbors translationally active RNA.

Artistic career 
Skop has curated an art show at the International C. elegans meeting, the "Worm Art Show", and she worked with the artist Angela Johnson to create an art installation called "Genetic Reflections".

Select publications

Honors and awards 
Skop was a 2006 Presidential Early Career Award for Scientists and Engineers award winner. In 2009 Skop received an honorary Doctorate of Science from the College of Saint Benedict, and in 2018 Skop was awarded by the American Society for Cell Biology for her work in inclusivity, the first time this prize was given.

References

External links 
 

Living people
Genetics
Artist authors
Syracuse University alumni
University of Wisconsin–Madison alumni
University of Wisconsin–Madison faculty
American women scientists
1972 births